Auchenharvie Colliery was a colliery formerly located in the Auchenharvie area of Stevenston, Ayrshire, Scotland that was devastated by a pit disaster on 2 August 1895 in which nine people died.

List of the deceased
 John Clauchan (35)
 William Clauchan (56)   This age date for William is in error: Please see record attached for ages of Glachan brothers at death 2-6 August 1895
1895 Death Certificate    Name of Parish/District Stevenston  Parish/District Number 615 Entry No 85  Surname Glauchan Mother's Name Helen  Name(s) William and Surname Glauchan  Age 28 Mother's Occupation  Occupation Coalminer Alive / deceased? Deceased Other information      

Record of Corrected entries. Sept 30 1895    
The Auchenharvie Mine Disaster  1895  On Friday 2 August 1895 a disaster occurred at No 4 pit in which nine people died and five men were rescued after being entombed from the Friday morning until Sunday afternoon. This disaster was caused by the breaking through of water from the old workings to the east of the Capon Craig Gaw. This ' Gaw ' was supposed never to have been cut. It would appear, however, that at some former period it must have been pierced for about 3 p.m. on that day an outburst of water suddenly took place in the extreme rise of No 4. One of the sad features of the disaster was the loss it entailed on two families, one of which named GLAUCHAN lost four members while the other, named Mullen, lost two.  The Deceased were:-  Robert Conn aged 16 of Grange Street, Stevenston.  Duncan Gallagher aged 32 of Schoolwell Street - brother -in - law to the Glauchans - left 5 children.  4 members of the Glauchan family of Townhead Street, Stevenston, John aged 30, WILLIAM AGE 26YRS,  James aged 19, and Henry aged 17.  John McGee - aged 14  Brothers James 19 and Peter 14 Mullen both of Schoolwell Street, Stevenston  The miners that survived entombment were:-  Charles Clark, Station Square, Stevenston, age 21  William Hamilton aged 22  Alexander Macadam, Old Square, Stevenston age 38 brother in law of  Michael McCarroll, Ardeer Square, aged 40  Robert Park, New Street  
 James Clauchan (21)
 Henry Clauchan (18)
 Duncan Gallacher (31)
 James Mullen (19)
 Peter Mullen (14)
 Robert McConn (18)
 John McGhee (14)

Trivia
The event has been immortalised in the poem "The Star of Young McGhee".

External links
Auchenharvie Mining Disaster Pages 

1895 in Scotland
History of North Ayrshire
Coal mining in Scotland
Ardrossan−Saltcoats−Stevenston